Padi Pishir Barmi Baksha (Burmese Box of Aunt Padi) is a Bengali adventure comedy film directed by Arundhati Devi. It is based on the children's novel of the same name by Leela Majumdar. This film was released in 1972 under the banner of Anindiya Chitra. This film is  Devi's most famous directorial work.

Plot
Khoka is a schoolboy who goes to his uncle's house, where he learns about the tales of Padi Pishi (Aunt Padi), a formidable widow. She had once went to Khuro's house to meet him, but bandits attacked her. When Khuro got to know about it, he offered her bribes from his loot so that the news would not be public. Padi Pishi then took a precious Burmese box that was hidden in Khuro's house. Before Padi's Pishi's death, she did not reveal the hiding place to anyone except her son Goja. The entire family searched for the missing box but could not recover it. A private detective also searched for the box but cannot find it. The story is about how it is finally discovered.

Cast
 Chhaya Devi as Padi Pishi
Ajitesh Bandopadhyay as Bandit Uncle
 Rabi Ghosh as Private detective
 Jahor Roy
 Rudraprasad Sengupta
 Chinmoy Roy
 Nripati Chattopadhyay
 Haradhan Bandopadhyay
 Ketaki Dutta
 Rajlakshmi Devi
 Mrinal Mukherjee
 Tapati Ghosh
 Nirmal Kumar

References

External links
 

1972 films
Indian children's films
Bengali-language Indian films
1970s adventure comedy films
Films based on Indian novels
Indian adventure comedy films
1970s Bengali-language films
1972 comedy films